The men's marathon at the 2014 European Athletics Championships took place at the Letzigrund on 17 August.

Medalists

Records

Schedule

Results

Final

References

Final Results

Marathon M
Marathons at the European Athletics Championships
European Athletics Championships
Men's marathons
Marathons in Switzerland